Catherine Disher is a British-born Canadian actress. She has won two Gemini Awards: in 2005 for Best Actress for her role in the Canadian mini-series Snakes and Ladders, and in 2010 for her role in The Border. She was also nominated for her role as Dr. Natalie Lambert in the Forever Knight TV series.

She is known for her role as Jill Valentine in Resident Evil 3: Nemesis video game and in the Good Witch TV series and movies, portraying Martha Tinsdale, the mayor of Middleton.

Career
Disher had a supporting role on T. and T., the legal/action series starring Mr. T, and had another supporting role in the second season of the War of the Worlds series. She starred in Forever Knight from 1992 to 1996, and provided the voice of Jean Grey on the X-Men animated series from 1992 to 1997. She played Maggie Norton on the Canadian television series The Border from 2008 to 2010 and provides additional voices on the PBS Kids/CBC Kids series Super WHY!.

Apart from her work as an actor, Disher has done voice work for animated series and video games, such as Resident Evil 3: Nemesis and Sailor Moon. She also wrote one episode of the British-Canadian-Midwestern-French drama series The Campbells.

Disher played Martha Tinsdale in a series of made-for-TV movies about The Good Witch (alongside her X-Men co-star Chris Potter), and has continued the role on the television series Good Witch.

Personal life

She was formerly married to her X-Men co-star Cedric Smith, with whom she had a son, Darcy Montgomery Smith, in 1993.

Filmography

Live action

Film

Television
Forever Knight - Dr. Natalie Lambert
Snakes and Ladders – Minister Audrey Flankman
The Border - Maggie Norton
Murdoch Mysteries - Mrs. Galbraith
T. and T. - Sophie Rideau
The Winter of Red Snow - Mrs. Washington
War of the Worlds - Mana
Goosebumps - Mrs. Warren
Me and Luke - Beverly
North Shore Fish - Carole
Night Heat - Female Cop
Alfred Hitchcock Presents - Cindy Bertozzi
Conspiracy of Silence - Sherrie 
Good Witch - Mayor Martha Tinsdale
Street Legal - Violet Beltane
The Campbells - Christine
Katts and Dog - Katherine Anderson
Friday the 13th: The Series - Cathy Steiner/Crystal
Kung Fu: The Legend Continues - Karen Kaden/Madeline Palmer
The Associates - Janet Dry
Life with Derek - Mrs. Pummelman
Traders - Alison Pill
D.C. - Prosecutor
The Path to 9/11 - Diana Dean
Remedy - Linda Tuttle
Degrassi - Rhonda Patterson

Voice work
 Miss BG - Mrs. Martin (voice)
 X-Men - Jean Grey/Phoenix, Dazzler (voice)
 Spider-Man - Jean Grey (voice)
 Sailor Moon - Elizabeth, Mimet, Nekonell  (voice)
 Atomic Betty - Penelope Lang, Sarah (voice)
 Care Bears: Journey to Joke-a-lot - Friend Bear (voice)
 The Care Bears' Big Wish Movie - Friend Bear (voice)
 Super Why! - Additional Voices
 Stickin' Around - Mrs. Stella Stickler (voice)
 Wild C.A.T.s - Additional Voices
 Highlander: The Animated Series - Additional Voices
 A Miser Brothers' Christmas - Mrs. Claus (voice)
 Franklin - Mrs. Goose (voice)
 Franklin and the Green Knight - Mrs. Goose (voice)
 Peep and the Big Wide World - Dragonfly (voice)
 Miss Spider's Sunny Patch Friends - Druey-Ruby's Mom (voice)
 Mr. Men and Little Miss - Mr. Muddle, Little Miss Splendid, Little Miss Naughty, Little Miss Tiny, Little Miss Helpful, Little Miss Shy, Little Miss Scatterbrain, Little Miss Giggles, Little Miss Twins, Little Miss Lucky, Little Miss Contrary, Little Miss Busy, Little Miss Wise, Little Miss Stubborn, Little Miss Curious, Little Miss Somersault, Additional Voices
 Helen Crawford - Ms Sandy (voice)
 Noddy - Noddy, Master Tubby Bear, Sly (voice)
 Babar - Additional Voices
 Rolie Polie Olie - Mrs. Bromley "Polina" Polie, Hammy Lady ("Through Trick and Thin"), TV Contestant ("Guess It's Nite Nite"), Tape Voice ("Babies Go Home") (voice)
 Rolie Polie Olie: The Great Defender of Fun - Mrs. Bromley "Polina" Polie, TV Journalist (voice)
 Rolie Polie Olie: The Baby Bot Chase - Mrs. Bromley "Polina" Polie, Tape Voice (voice)
 Police Academy: The Animated Series - Auntie Bertha (voice)
 Little Bear - Additional Voices
 The Little Bear Movie - Mrs. Moose (voice)
 Ultraforce - Topaz (voice)
 Free Willy - Additional Voices
 Mythic Warriors: Guardians of the Legend - Female Peasant/Plump Chambermaid/Theseus' Mother (voice)
 Ned's Newt - Additional Voices
 Pippi Longstocking - Additional Voices
 Puppets Who Kill - Lindsay Fang (voice)
 Ace Ventura: Pet Detective - Additional Voices
 Abby Hatcher - Judge Thorn (voice)
 The Busy World of Richard Scarry - Additional Voices
 Rescue Heroes - Additional Voices
 Dog City - Additional Voices
 Corduroy - Additional Voices
 Marvin The Tap-Dancing Horse - Additional Voices
 Harry and His Bucket Full of Dinosaurs - Lightning (voice)
 Freaky Stories - Additional Voices
 The Incredible Hulk - Additional Voices
 Redwall - Mrs. Churchmouse/Winifred/Sparra (voice)
 Tales from the Cryptkeeper - Additional Voices
 Roboroach - Additional Voices
 Sam and Max: Freelance Police - Additional Voices
 Cadillacs and Dinosaurs - Additional Voices
 Medabots - Additional Voices
 Birdz - Additional Voices
 Blazing Dragons - Additional Voices
 Pandalian - Additional Voices
 Bakugan Battle Brawlers - Additional Voices
 Beyblade - Additional Voices
 Flying Rhino Junior High - Additional Voices
 Cyberchase - Additional Voices
 Hippo Tub Company - Repeatr
 The Dumb Bunnies - Voice
 Monster by Mistake - Voice
 Rupert - Additional Voices
 Flash Gordon - Additional Voices
 What It's Like Being Alone - Voice
 Bedtime Primetime Classics - Voice
 Jacob Two-Two - Voice
 Jane and the Dragon - Voice
 The Neverending Story - Additional Voices
 Undergrads - Voice
 Traffix - Voice
 Grossology - Additional Voices
 Mischief City - Additional Voices
 The Berenstain Bears - Additional Voices
 Anatole - Additional Voices
 Bob and Margaret - Voice
 Bad Dog - Additional Voices
 Diabolik - Additional Voices
 Avengers: United They Stand - Additional Voices
 Silver Surfer - Additional Voices
 Timothy Goes to School - Voice
 Captain Flamingo - Otto, Additional Voices
 Moville Mysteries - Additional Voices
 Blaster's Universe - Additional Voices
 Iggy Arbuckle - Additional Voices
 King - Additional Voices
 Toot and Puddle - Voice
 Mini-Man - Voice
 Delta State - Voice
 Funpak - Voice
 Spider Riders - Voice
 Turbo Dogs - Auntie Rachett (voice)
 Wilbur - Voice
 Little Shop - Voice
 Monster Force - Additional Voices
 Di-Gata Defenders - Voice
 Willa's Wild Life - Voice
 Busytown Mysteries - Additional Voices
 Gerald McBoing Boing - Voice
 Super Why! - Additional Voices
 World of Quest - Additional Voices
 Spliced - Additional Voices
 Jimmy Two-Shoes - Additional Voices
 Franny's Feet - Additional Voices
 Bonnie Bear - Bonnie
 Chilly Beach - Additional Voices
 Delilah and Julius - Additional Voices
 Anne of Green Gables: The Animated Series - Voice
 Yin Yang Yo! - Voice
 Magi-Nation - Voice
 The Wumblers - Voice
 Babar and the Adventures of Badou - Miss Strich (voice)
 Producing Parker - Tara Moody
 Mysticons - Mrs. Sparklebottom, Alarm
 Thomas & Friends: All Engines Go - Annie (US/UK; 2021-2022)

Video games

References

External links

Living people
Actresses from Montreal
Anglophone Quebec people
Best Actress in a Drama Series Canadian Screen Award winners
Best Supporting Actress in a Drama Series Canadian Screen Award winners
Canadian film actresses
Canadian television actresses
Canadian television writers
Canadian video game actresses
Canadian voice actresses
English emigrants to Canada
Canadian women television writers
Writers from Montreal
20th-century Canadian actresses
21st-century Canadian actresses
20th-century English people
21st-century English people
20th-century English women
21st-century English women
Year of birth missing (living people)